The 4e Escadre de Chasse 4e EC or 4th Fighter Wing  is a fighter unit formation of the French Air and Space Force. The unit was initially created on May 1, 1944 then dissolved on September 1, 1993 with the disappearing of the Escadre echelon from the French Air and Space Force.

The 4th Fighter Wing was reformed on an Aerial Base on August 26, 2015.

History 
The 4e Escadre de Chasse was formed at Alto, Corsica on May 1, 1944, and initially was composed of a single group (Groupe de Chasse II/5 (GC II/5) La Fayette), equipped with 15 Republic P-47 Thunderbolts, being joined by  Groupe de Chasse II/3 (GC II/3) Dauphiné on 8 June 1944. The wing was deployed on fighter-bomber missions over Italy from May to August 1944, and from June began to supplement these missions with operations over France. In September, following the Allied invasion of Southern France the previous month, the wing moved to mainland France. It was joined by a third group, Groupe de Chasse III/3 (GC III/3) Ardennes at the end of the year.

The 4e Escadre de Chasse left the FATac on September 1, 1991 to be attached to the Strategic Air Forces Command (FAS).

Composition since 2015 

The 4e Escadre de Chasse 4e EC was reformed in 2015 with the following squadrons:

 Escadron de Chasse 1/4 Gascogne, EC 1/4 Gascogne
 Escadron de Chasse 2/4 La Fayette, EC 2/4 La Fayette
 Escadron de Transformation Rafale 3/4 Aquitaine, ETR 3/4 Aquitaine
 Escadron de Soutien Technique Aéronautique 15/004 Haute-Marne, ESTA 15/004 Haute-Marne

On June 24, 2016, a ceremony celebrated the departure of the 1/7 Provence towards an Aerial Base in the United Arab Emirates and the arrival of Escadron de Chasse 3/30 Lorraine to Saint Dizier. The EC 3/30 Lorraine moved to Mont-de-Marsan that summer. Nevertheless, the latter is not part of the 4e Escadre de Chasse 4e EC, however, constitutes the 30e EC.

Historical Escadrons/Squadrons

Ardennes 

 Fighter Group - Groupe de Chasse III/3 Ardennes (from October 31, 1944 until March 1, 1946)
 Fighter Squadron - Escadron de Chasse 4/4 Ardennes  (EC 4/4 Ardennes) (from January 1, 1950 until October 1, 1950), known as Escadron de Chasse 3/3 Ardennes at the corps of the 3e Escadre de Chasse (3e EC) at an Aerial Base.

Dauphiné 

 Fighter Group - Groupe de Chasse II/3 Dauphiné (from May 1, 1944 until July 1, 1947)
 Fighter Group - Groupe de Chasse I/4 Dauphiné (from July 1, 1947 until November 1, 1949)
 Escadron de Chasse 1/4 Dauphiné (from November 1, 1949 until August 26, 1993)

Flandres 

 Escadron de Chasse 3/4 Flandres (from January 1, 1950 until November 1, 1957)

La Fayette 

Groupe de Chasse II/5 La Fayette (from May 1, 1944 until July 1, 1947) 
Groupe de Chasse II/4 La Fayette (from July 1, 1947 until November 1, 1949)
Escadron de chasse 2/4 La Fayette (from November 1, 1949 until August 26, 1993)

Limousin 

Escadron de Chasse 3/4 Limousin (from August 1, 1989 until August 26, 1993)

Navarre 

Groupe de Chasse I/4 Navarre (from May 1, 1944 until December 7, 1994)

EALA 

During the Algerian War, three Light Support Escadrilles Aviation units were patronized by the 4e Escadre de Chasse :

 EALA 5/70 (from July 1, 1956 until June 30, 1957), re-designated EALA 17/72 (from July 1, 1957 until November 30, 1959)
 EALA 7/70 (from March 1, 1956 until June 30, 1957), re-designated EALA 18/72 (from July 1, 1957 November 30, 1959)
 EALA 3/4 (from December 1, 1959 until March 30, 1962)

Base 

 Alto, Corsica (1944)
 Ambérieu (1944-1945)
 Luxeuil (1944-1945) 
 Coblence then Mayence (from August 29, 1945 until August 19, 1947)
 Indochina (Hanoi, Gia Lam and Don Hoi) (from August 19, 1947 until August 26, 1948)
 Aerial Base in Germany (from August 26, 1948 until March 30, 1954)
 Aerial Base at Bône (from July 1, 1956 until November 30, 1959) (EALA 5/70, then EALA 17/72)
 Aerial Base at Oued Hamimin (from March 1, 1956 until November 30, 1959) (EALA 7/70 then EALA 8/72)
 Aerial Base at Telergma (from December 1, 1959 until March 30, 1962) (EALA 3/4) 
 Aerial Base in Germany (from April 1, 1954 until June 5, 1961)
 Aerial Base (from June 6, 1961 until August 26, 1993)
 Aerial Base (from August 1, 1989 until August 26, 1993) (for the 3/4 Limousin)
 Aerial Base (August 26, 2015 – present)

Equipment 
 P-47D (from May 1, 1944 until December 1949)  	
 Supermarine Spitfire Mk.IX (from September 1947 until August 1948)  
 De Havilland Vampire	(from October 1949 until 1953)
 Dassault Ouragan (from July 1954 until 1957) 
 Republic F-84F (from May 1957 until 1966) 
 North American T-6G (from March 1, 1956 until February 1961) (
 North AmericanT-28 (from February 1961 until March 30, 1962) 
 Dassault Mirage IIIE (from October 1966 until November 1, 1988) 
 Dassault Mirage 2000N (since March 31, 1988) 
 Dassault Rafale B/C (since August 26, 2015)

See also

Major (France)
Chief of Staff of the French Air Force
List of Escadres of the French Air Force
List of aircraft carriers of France
Submarine forces (France)

References

Notes

 
 

Military units and formations of the French Air and Space Force
Fighter aircraft units and formations
Military units and formations established in 1944
Military units and formations established in 2015